Dodge Township is a township in Ford County, Kansas, United States.  As of the 2000 census, its population was 899.

Geography
According to the USGS, it contains one cemetery, Greencrest Memorial Garden.

Demographics

2020 census
As of the 2020 census, there were 683 people, 299 households, and 230 families residing in the township.

References

External links
 City-Data.com

Townships in Ford County, Kansas
Townships in Kansas